Jörg Dallmann (born 10 August 1979) is a German speed skater. He competed in two events at the 2006 Winter Olympics.

References

1979 births
Living people
German male speed skaters
Olympic speed skaters of Germany
Speed skaters at the 2006 Winter Olympics
Sportspeople from Erfurt